Jõgisoo may refer to several places in Estonia:

Jõgisoo, Harju County, village in Saue Parish, Harju County
Jõgisoo, Järva County, village in Ambla Parish, Järva County
Jõgisoo, Lääne County, village in Kullamaa Parish, Lääne County